Raluca Olaru and Valeria Solovyeva won the first edition of the tournament over first seeded Anna-Lena Grönefeld and Květa Peschke with the score 2–6, 7–6(7–3), [11–9].

Seeds

Draw

Draw

References
 Main Draw

Nurnberger Versicherungscupandnbsp;- Doubles
2013 Doubles
2013 in German tennis